Dharan is a sub-metropolitan city in Nepal.

Dharan may also refer to:
Dharani Dharan, Indian Tamil filmmaker
Dharan Kumar (born 1983), Indian Tamil composer
Dharan F.C., an association football club based in Dharan, Nepal

See also
Dhahran, a town in Saudi Arabia